Hulkur is a small village in the Malur Taluk of Kolar district in Karnataka, India. It is situated about 13 kilometers from Malur.

Demographics 
According to the 2011 Indian Census, the village consists of 823 people. The town has a literacy rate of 64.52 percent which is lower than Karnataka's average of 75.36 percent.

References

Villages in Kolar district